The Mongolic languages are a language family that is spoken in East-Central Asia, mostly in Mongolia, Inner Mongolia, an autonomous region of China, Xinjiang, another autonomous region of China, the region of Qinghai, and also in Kalmykia, a republic of Southern European Russia.

Mongolic is a small, relatively homogenous and recent language family whose common ancestor, Proto-Mongolian, was spoken at the beginning of the second millennium AD.

However, Proto-Mongolian seems to descend from a common ancestor to languages like Khitan, which are sister languages of Mongolian languages (they do not descend from Proto-Mongolian but are sister languages from an even older language from the first millennium AD, i.e. Para-Mongolian).

The Mongolic language family has about 6 million speakers. The best-known member of this language family, Mongolian, is the primary language of most of the residents of Mongolia and the Mongolian residents of Inner Mongolia, with an estimated 5.2 million speakers.

Hypothetical ancestors
Hypothetical relation to other language families and their proto-languages 
Para-Mongolic (?) (all extinct?)
Donghu (?)
Khitan (?)  
Tuyuhun (?)
Wuhuan (?)
Xianbei (?)
Pre-Proto-Mongolic
Early Pre-Proto-Mongolic
Late Pre-Proto-Mongolic

Ancestral
Proto-Mongolic language

Historical Mongolic
 Middle Mongol
Daur / Dagur
 Nonni Daur
 Hailar Daur 
 Amur Daur 
 Central Mongolic
 Central Proper
Classical Mongolian, from approximately 1700 to 1900
Khalkha
Khalkha
 Northern Khalkha
 Darkhad
 Southern Khalkha
 Shilingol/Xilingol
 Sönid
 Ulaanchab
 Alasha
  Baarin
 Chakhar
 Ordos 
 Khamnigan 
 Western
 Oirat-Kalmyk
 Dörbet
 Bayat 
 Torgut 
 Altai Uriankhai
 Ööld
 Zakhchin 
 Khoton
 Kalmyk
 Eastern
 Kharchin / Khorchin
 Northern
 Buryat 
 Khori group
 Alar–Tunka group
 Ekhirit–Bulagat group
 Bargut group 
 Lower Uda 
 Southern Mongolic (part of a Gansu–Qinghai Sprachbund)
Shira Yugur / Eastern Yugur
 
Monguor 
Mongghul
Mongghuor
Mangghuer
 Bonan (Manegacha) 
 Tongren
 Ñantoq Baoan 
 Transitional Bonan-Kangjia 
 Kangjia 
 Santa / Sarta (Dongxiang) 
 Suonanba
 Wangjiaji 
 Sijiaji 
 Moghol / Mogholi (almost extinct or extinct)

Possible Mongolic languages (all extinct)
Unclassified languages that may have been Mongolic or members of other language families include:
Tabγač / Tuoba (Mongolic or Turkic language)
Xiongnu (may have been the same as the Hunnic language)

See also
 Mongolic languages

References

Sources

 
 
 
 Janhunen, Juha. 2012. Khitan – Understanding the language behind the scripts. SCRIPTA, Vol. 4: 107–132.
 
 
 
 
 
 [Sechenbaatar] Sečenbaγatur, Qasgerel, Tuyaγ-a, B. ǰirannige, U Ying ǰe. (2005). Mongγul kelen-ü nutuγ-un ayalγun-u sinǰilel-ün uduridqal. Kökeqota: ÖMAKQ.
 
 

 
 Vovin, Alexander. 2007. Once again on the Tabgač language. Mongolian Studies XXIX: 191–206.

External links
 Ethnic map of Mongolia
 Monumenta Altaica grammars, texts, dictionaries and bibliographies of Mongolian and other Altaic languages

 
Languages of Mongolia
Mongolic